Kenneth A. "Wild Bill" Kelly (June 1, 1905 – March 7, 1984) was an American football, basketball, and tennis player and coach.  He served as the head football coach at Central Michigan University from 1951 to 1966, compiling a record of 91–58–2, and the head basketball coach at Central Michigan for two seasons from 1954 to 1956, tallying a mark of 23–20.  Kelly/Shorts Stadium, the home field of the Central Michigan Chippewas football program, was renamed in Kelly's honor in 1983.  Kelly died on March 7, 1984, at the age of 78.

Head coaching record

College football

References

1905 births
1984 deaths
American men's basketball players
American tennis coaches
Central Michigan Chippewas football coaches
Central Michigan Chippewas football players
Central Michigan Chippewas men's basketball coaches
Central Michigan Chippewas men's basketball players
High school football coaches in Michigan
People from Bowling Green, Ohio
People from Mount Pleasant, Michigan